Belarus is a country in Eastern Europe.

Belarus may also refer to:

 Belarus (tractor), a brand of tractors produced at the Minsk Tractor Works
 Biełarus, a Belarusian newspaper published in the US
 Belarus (pianos), a Belarusian piano manufacturer

See also
 Radio Belarus, the official international broadcasting station of Belarus
 Byelorussia (disambiguation)
 White Ruthenia, an archaism for the eastern Belarus